William Baxter ALS, FHS (Rugby, Warwickshire, January 15, 1787 - November 1, 1871), was a British botanist, author of British Phaenogamous Botany and appointed curator of the Oxford Botanic Garden in 1813.

British Phaenogamous Botany or Figures and Descriptions of the Genera of British Flowering Plants, was published in 6 volumes by William Baxter between 1834 and 1843, with 509 hand-coloured copper-plate engravings by Isaac Russell (an Oxford glass painter) and C. Matthews. These men were not trained botanical artists, but gradually acquired a good working knowledge of the subject. The engravings were later hand-coloured by Baxter's daughters and daughter-in-law. The volumes were sold by Whittaker, Treacher and Co., London and John W. Parker.

William Hart Baxter (c.1816-1890), William Baxter's son, succeeded his father as curator of the Oxford Botanic Garden.
This botanist is denoted by the author abbreviation Baxter when citing a botanical name.

References

See also
List of florilegia and botanical codices

External links
Googlebooks - British Phaenogamous Botany

Botanists with author abbreviations
Scottish botanists
Scottish botanical writers
Fellows of the Linnean Society of London
1787 births
1871 deaths
Scottish curators